B. B. D. Bagh, formerly called Tank Square and then Dalhousie Square (1847 to 1856), is the shortened version for Benoy-Badal-Dinesh Bagh. It is the seat of power of the state government, as well as the central business district of Kolkata in Kolkata district in the Indian state of West Bengal.

Origin of name

B. B. D. stands for three young Indian independence activists — Benoy Basu, Badal Gupta and Dinesh Gupta — who on 8 December 1930 assassinated the Inspector General of Prisons, N.S. Simpson, in the balconies of the Writers' Building of the then Dalhousie Square. The square had been named after Lord Dalhousie, Governor General of India from 1847 to 1856. At different times it has been called ‘The Green before the Fort’ and the Tank Square.

Geography
The B.B.D. Bagh area is near the Hooghly River in the western part of Central Kolkata and is a square built around the old Lal Dighi tank. The old fort built by the British was near where the General Post Office now is. The area was in the heart of Kalikata or the White Town in old Calcutta.

History

B.B.D. Bagh (or Dalhousie Square as it was formerly known) was created as the center of the British East India Company's trading post along the banks of the Hooghly River. Between the river and the tank (now known as Lal Dighi), lay the original Fort William. In the summer of 1756, Nawab Siraj ud-Daulah of Bengal, Bihar and Orissa launched an attack on the British town for the company's decision to strengthen the fortifications around it. The survivors of the attack were sent to a garrison within the fort which spurred an incident infamously known as the Black Hole of Calcutta. The British soon retook the city after the Nawab retreated from the forces of Robert Clive. Within a year, the British East India Company's forces had taken all of Bengal and Calcutta, along with the square, was established as the commercial and political center of British India.

Over the next one and a half centuries, the square grew in importance and influence. It was named after Lord Dalhousie, the Governor-General of India. After the fall of company rule in India, Writers' Building became the secretariat of the Viceroy of India. A number of corporations and institutions opened offices and headquarters in and around the square, giving it its role as the central business district of the city. In 1912, the capital of the British Raj was officially moved to New Delhi, but the majority of the financial and political institutions in the area remained until the late 1920s.

During the first half of the 20th century, the Indian Independence Movement began to reach its peak and took a violent turn in Bengal. On the eighth of December 1930, three revolutionaries, Benoy, Badal and Dinesh, stormed the building and fatally shot the Inspector General of Prisons, N.S. Simpson. The three committed suicide and the square was renamed B.B.D. Bagh in their honor after Indian independence. In 1947, the political establishments were officially handed over to the government of India and the government of the newly formed state of West Bengal. Over the next few decades, Kolkata would go through rapid economic decline, but B.B.D. Bagh would remain the heart of East India.

Modern significance

B.B.D. Bagh is still the commercial and political center of all of East India and many of the business and political institutions from the colonial era still exist. The centerpiece is the Writers' Building which is the secretariat of the Government of the State of West Bengal and houses the office of the Chief Minister of West Bengal. To the west lie the General Post Office, the Royal Insurance Building, the eastern office of the Reserve Bank of India, the headquarters of the Eastern Railway, head office of the Kolkata Port Trust and a number of other government offices. The native name of the area is 'Office Para'. To the north lie the Royal Exchange Building which houses the Bengal Chamber of Commerce and Industry, the Calcutta Stock Exchange, the Standard Chartered Building and many financial establishments. The eastern end also houses a number of offices till Chittaranjan Avenue. The south area of the square is home to the Raj Bhavan, which is now the residence of the governor and the former residence of the viceroy and governor-general of India. A number of former British colonial administrative offices, including the former foreign and military secretariats, the Treasury Office, the Telegraph Office and Kolkata Town Hall can be found here. This area is also a major commercial district with the offices of HSBC at Hong Kong House and the Great Eastern Hotel.

B.B.D. Bagh can still be considered one of the best remnants and concentrated zones of British colonial architecture in the world. The square is also characterized by other historical landmarks including St. John's Church, which was one of the first buildings in Kolkata and is modeled on St. Martin-in-the-Fields in London's Trafalgar Square. The church is home to beautiful stained glass windows and paintings as well as the mausoleum of Job Charnock, the man who founded modern Kolkata. B.B.D. Bagh also has a statue of famous philanthropist Maharaja Lakshmeshwar Singh of Darbhanga (1858–1898), sculpted by Edward Onslow Ford.

Overall, the square sees thousands of people arriving from all over the Kolkata metropolitan area to the offices and businesses that have characterized the area for the last three centuries since the establishment of Kolkata.

Preservation
Dalhousie Square was included in the 2004 and 2006 World Monuments Watch by the World Monuments Fund due to "decades of neglect". After this listing the international financial services company American Express provided funding through WMF for the square's preservation. A number of buildings in the area have also been listed as heritage buildings and have gone through extensive restorations to bring back the charm of the square. The centerpiece, Writers' Building, has been temporarily vacated to give way for a massive restoration of the building, which has fallen into disrepair in many areas.

Gallery

References

External links

 

Neighbourhoods in Kolkata
Tourist attractions in Kolkata
Central business districts in India
Road junctions in India
Squares in India